The 1931 CCNY Lavender football team was an American football team that represented the City College of New York (CCNY) as an independent during the 1931 college football season. In their eighth season under Harold J. Parker, the Lavender team compiled a 2–5–1 record.

Schedule

References

CCNY
CCNY Beavers football seasons
CCNY Lavender football